Drinnan Peak is a  mountain summit located in the Valhalla Ranges of the Selkirk Mountains in southeast British Columbia, Canada. The mountain is named for Bill Drinnan who trapped in the vicinity in the 1920s and 1930s. Drinnon Peak was adopted in 1976 in association with Drinnon Lake. To conform with the correct spelling of the family name, the spelling was changed to Drinnan Peak, and officially adopted February 3, 1986, by the Geographical Names Board of Canada.

Based on the Köppen climate classification, Drinnan Peak has a subarctic climate with cold, snowy winters, and mild summers. Its nearest higher peak is Mount Prestley,  to the southeast. The first ascent of the peak was made August 19, 1974, by Bob Dean,  Janice Isaac, Kim Kratky, and Peter Wood.

See also
 
Geography of British Columbia

References

External links
 Weather forecast: Drinnan Peak  

Two-thousanders of British Columbia
Selkirk Mountains
Kootenay Land District